Lieutenant General Dennis Sitali Alibuzwi, also Dennis Alibuzwi, is a Zambian military officer who has been the Commander of the Zambian Army since 29 August 2021. He was promoted from the rank of Major General to Lieutenant General, on the day that he was appointed Commander of the Army. He replaced Lieutenant General William Sikazwe, who served in that role between December 2018 and August 2021. The Zambian Army is one of the three components of the Zambian Defence Force.

Before he became Army Commander, he was the Deputy Commander of the Zambian Amy, at the rank of Major General, from January 2019 until August 2021. He was sworn in as Deputy Commander of the Army on 2 January 2019, by President Edgar Lungu, the appointing authority.

See also
 Military ranks of Zambia

References

External links
 UN official hails Zambia's role in CAR security efforts As of 11 November 2020.

 

Living people
Year of birth missing (living people)
Zambian military personnel
Zambian generals